Kadamankulam is a village in Peruvanthanam village Panchayath, of Perumedu taluk, Idukki District of Kerala, India.

Location
The nearest towns are Pandalam and Adoor. It is in the border of both Alappuzha and Pathanamthitta Districts.

Economy
Agriculture is the main occupation of people here. Like any other village in this part of Kerala, many of youth are working outside India in different sectors. This village is near 2 kilometers from KP Road (Kayankulam- Punaloor) near Pazhakulam and 3 kilometers from MC road (Main Central) near Kurampala.

Community life
St. Mary's Orthodox Church is one of the main religious institution here. Navodaya Art's and Sport's club, Navodaya Library and many other organisations are working here. The Onam celebrations on Thiruvonam day (the most important day of Onam) organised by Navodaya is the main celebrations here.

References

Villages in Alappuzha district